The Liga Uruguaya de Básquetbol MVP (English: Uruguayan Basketball League MVP) is the annual basketball award, that is given by the professional Uruguayan top-tier level Liga Uruguaya de Básquetbol (LUB) (Uruguayan Basketball League), to its Most Valuable Player of each league season. The award began with the league's inaugural 2003 season. Diego Castrillón was the first award winner. Leandro García Morales has won the most awards so far, having won four.

Winners

Players with multiple MVPs won

See also
Uruguayan Basketball League Finals MVP
Uruguayan Basketball League (2003–present)
Uruguayan Federal Basketball Championship (1915–2003)
Uruguayan Basketball Champions
Uruguayan Basketball Federation (FUBB)

References

External links
Uruguayan Basketball Federation FUBB 
Uruguayan Basketball League at Latinbasket.com 

Uruguay
MVP